Claremont High School was a non-denominational, state-funded secondary school based in the St Leonards area of East Kilbride. It closed in June 2007 and merged with Hunter High School to form the new Calderglen High School, although Calderglen met in the Claremont building until February 2008 when the new building opened on the same site. It was originally one of six state Secondary schools in East Kilbride until, after a school modernisation program by South Lanarkshire Council, they were merged into three schools.

Studio32 Theatre Company
A teachers' strike in 1985 led to the establishment of Studio32 by Liane McKenna and Vikki England née Carrick, an amateur theatre company that has since grown to be the leading community theatre company in the area. The name refers to the drama classroom in the school (A32) where rehearsals were first held.  Studio32 celebrated its 30th anniversary in 2015 with a production of Oliver!.

Notable alumni
 Lee Alexander, Scotland Women's International Footballer
 John Hannah, Film and television actor
 Lorraine Kelly, Television presenter
 Andy Kerr, Scottish Politician
 Fraser Kerr, Footballer currently with Stenhousemuir
 Jordan McGhee, Scotland U21 International Footballer, currently with Dundee
 Iain Stewart, Geologist
 Alasdair Strokosch, Scotland International Rugby player
 Robbie Winters, Scotland International Footballer
 Frazer Wright, Footballer currently with Stirling Albion

References

External links
Hmie Report

Educational institutions disestablished in 2008
Educational institutions established in 1970
Defunct secondary schools in South Lanarkshire
Buildings and structures in East Kilbride
2007 disestablishments in Scotland
1970 establishments in Scotland
Buildings and structures completed in 1970
Buildings and structures demolished in 2008